Zodiac Killers is a 1991 Hong Kong action thriller drama film directed by Ann Hui and starring Andy Lau, Cherie Chung and Junichi Ishida.

The inspiration of Zodiac Killers came from the case of a mainland Chinese female student studying abroad in Japan who died when she fell onto the tracks. Zodiac Killers is Hong Kong New Wave's representative Ann Hui's first attempt at making a commercial film, which, however, did not perform very well at the local box office. Even after finishing the film for a long time, no film producers came to her to make a film.

Plot 
Hong Kong student Ben Lee becomes friends with his mainland Chinese classmate Chang Chih while studying abroad in Japan. Ben is unmotivated to study and only cares about money and on the other hand, whenever Chih encounters a Chinese person, he would ask whereabouts of his childhood sweetheart. Ben and Chih's friend, Ming, is also from Hong Kong and in order to elevate his social status, he becomes involved with a bar hostess and owner Yuriko, hoping to become Yakuza leader Yamada Ishikawa's brother in-law.

In Yuriko's bar, Ben encounters Chinese student Mang Tit-lan, who is there to earn some extra money, and falls in love with her at first sight but is not favored. Tit-lan and her friend Mei-mei live with their guarantor and suffers a lot of humiliation.

Tit-lan is in love with Hideyuki Asano, who works as Yamada's top assassin, who went to South America to kill Yamada's enemy, but eventually came back to reunite with Tit-lan. However, Yamada send his men to have Asano silenced and right before he dies, he asks Tit-lan to expose Yamada to the police but Tit-lan faces the underworld's pursue to kill her.

Since Tit-lan's passport was detained by her guarantor, Ben had to help her sneak out of Japan on a boat, but the thugs arrive right after hearing the news. Ben and Tit-lan attempt to leave the oppressing country.

Cast 
 Andy Lau as Ben Lee
 Cherie Chung as Mang Tit-lan
 Junichi Ishida as Hideyuki Asano
 Kyoko Kishida Old geisha Miyako (cameo)
 Takazawa Zunko as Yuriko
 Yasuaki Kurata as Yamada Ishikawa (cameo)
 Tou Chung-hua as Chang Chih
 Suen Pang as Ming
 Law Fei-yu as Harada
 Tsang Wai-fai as Mei-mei

Theme song 
 Red Dream (紅塵夢)
 Composer: Wong Sze-yuen
 Lyricist: Thomas Chow
 Singer: Andy Lau

Release 
Considering its large budget for this commercial film compared to Ann Hui's other art films, Zodiac Killers grossed a disappointing HK$9,081,083 during its theatrical run from 20 July to 8 August 1991 in Hong Kong.

Reception 
Ben Sachs of the Chicago Reader wrote, "As an action movie, this is just fine [..] But as a portrait of cultural displacement, this is evocative and sometimes very moving."

Awards and nominations

See also 
 Andy Lau filmography

References

External links 
 
 Zodiac Killers at Hong Kong Cinemagic
 
 Zodiac Killers film review at LoveHKFilm.com

1991 films
1991 action thriller films
1991 drama films
1991 martial arts films
1990s action drama films
1990s Cantonese-language films
1990s thriller drama films
Hong Kong action thriller films
Hong Kong drama films
Hong Kong gangster films
Hong Kong martial arts films
Gun fu films
Yakuza films
Golden Harvest films
Films directed by Ann Hui
Films set in Tokyo
Films shot in Tokyo
Films with screenplays by Wu Nien-jen
1990s Japanese films
1990s Hong Kong films